Odorant-binding protein 2a is a protein that in humans is encoded by the OBP2A gene.

This gene encodes a small extracellular protein belonging to the lipocalin superfamily. The protein is thought to transport small, hydrophobic, volatile molecules or odorants through the nasal mucus to olfactory receptors, and may also function as a scavenger of highly concentrated or toxic odors. The protein is expressed as a monomer in the nasal mucus, and can bind diverse types of odorants with a higher affinity for aldehydes and fatty acids. This gene and a highly similar family member are located in a cluster of lipocalin genes on chromosome 9. Alternatively spliced transcript variants have been described, but their biological validity has not been determined.

References

Further reading

Lipocalins